Santa Bárbara Castle is a fortification in the center of Alicante, Spain.  It stands on Mount Benacantil (166 m).

History
Bronze Age, Iberian, and Roman artifacts have been found on the slopes of the mountain, but the origins of the castle date to the 9th century at the time of Muslim control of the Iberian Peninsula, from 711 till 1296.  The Arab medieval geographer Al-Idrisi calls this mountain Banu-lQatil, and the toponym may derive from the words pinna (Arabic for "peak") and laqanti, adjectival form of Laqant, the Arabic name for Alicante.

On 4 December 1248, the castle was captured by Castilian forces led by Alfonso of Castile. It was named after Saint Barbara, on whose feast day the castle was recaptured from the Arabs. It was conquered by the Aragonese in 1296 during the reign of James II of Aragon, who ordered its reconstruction.  Peter IV of Aragon, Charles I of Spain and Philip II of Spain would oversee further reconstructions.

The castle was bombarded in 1691 by a French squadron. During the War of the Spanish Succession, it was held by the British for three years. In 1873, it was bombarded, along with the city, by the cantonalistas from the frigate Numancia.

From the 18th century the military role of the castle has declined and it was used sometimes as a prison. From April 1939, with the end of the Spanish Civil War, it was used as a Francoist concentration camp for Republican prisoners until the end of that year.

The castle remained abandoned until 1963, when it was opened to the public.  Lifts have been installed inside the mountain (€2.70 charge in October 2018 but free for adults aged 65 on production of ID).  There are some guided tours at €3 per person and there are refreshments and other amenities at and near the summit.

References

External links
 Santa Barbara Castle at Alicante City Hall: brief history, detailed history, sketch map
 Evolution of fortifications of Santa Barbara Castle, Alicante 
 Catálogo del Patrimonio Cultural Valenciano 
 Reportaje Documental sobre el Castillo de Santa Barbara 

Castles in the Valencian Community
Buildings and structures in Alicante
Bien de Interés Cultural landmarks in the Province of Alicante
Francoist concentration camps